Bhagga (Sanskrit ) was an ancient Indo-Aryan tribe of north-eastern South Asia whose existence is attested during the Iron Age.

Location
The Bhaggas lived between the Gangā and the Yamunā, in the near north of the Vatsa kingdom's capital of Kosāmbī, and to the west of the Kāsī kingdom's capital of Vārāṇasī. The northern neighbour of the Bhaggas was the kingdom of Kosala.

The Bhaggas lived far from the other republican Indo-Aryan tribes such as the Licchavikas, Mallakas, Moriyas, Koliyas, and Sakyas, who were located between the Himalayas and the lower course of the Gangā, with the kingdoms of Kāsī and Kosala separating Bhagga from these tribes.

The capital of the Bhaggas was Suṃsumāragiri.

Name
The name of the Bhaggas is the Pali form of the name of the  Indo-Aryan ethnic group mentioned in Sanskrit literature.

History
The Mahabharata and the Harivansa states the close connection between the Vatsas and the Bhargas (Bhaggas).

The Bhaggas were dependencies of the kingdom of Vatsa, and therefore did not have sovereign rights concerning their external affairs and foreign policy although they were internally still organised as a republic. A prince of Vatsa lived in the Bhagga capital of Suṃsumāragiri as a viceroy of the king of Vatsa, who was the suzerain of the Bhaggas.

The Buddha visited Bhagga shortly after his Enlightenment, during the early phase of his preaching.

The Bhaggas had already been assimilated into Vatsa under the rule of the latter's king Udayana, and they were annexed by that kingdom under his successor around the time of the Buddha's death.

The Bhaggas were not among peoples who claimed a share of the Buddha's relics because they had stopped existing as an independent polity by the time of his death. Similarly, the Vaidehas and the Nāyikas did not claim a share of the relics because they were dependencies of the Licchavikas without their own sovereignty, and therefore could not put forth their own claim while the Licchavikas, the Mallakas, and the Sakyas could claim shares.

Political and social organisation

Republican institutions

The Assembly
Like the other , the ruling body of the Bhagga republic was an Assembly of the  elders who held the title of s (meaning "chiefs").

The Council
The Assembly met rarely, and the administration of the republic was instead in the hands of the Council, which was a smaller body of the Assembly composed of councillors selected from among the Assembly's members. The Council met more often than the Assembly.

The Consul
The Bhagga Assembly elected a consul  who presided over it and administered the republic with the help of the Council.

References

Sources

 

Ancient peoples of India
Ancient peoples of Nepal
Gaṇa saṅghas